Barguelonne-en-Quercy (literally Barguelonne in Quercy) is a commune in the Lot department in south-western France. It was established on 1 January 2019 by merger of the former communes of Saint-Daunès (the seat), Bagat-en-Quercy and Saint-Pantaléon.

See also
Communes of the Lot department

References

Communes of Lot (department)
Populated places established in 2019
2019 establishments in France